Strange Marriage may mean:

 alternate title of Slightly Married, a 1932 American film
 A Strange Marriage, a 1900 novel by Kálmán Mikszáth
 Különös házasság (A Strange Marriage), a 1951 Hungarian film based on Mikszáth's novel
 A Strange Marriage, a 1912(?) novel by Charles Garvice
 Strange Marriage, a 1931 novel by Netta Syrett
 Strange Marriage, an early novel by Joseph Hansen